Luis Miguel Gracia Julián (born 18 July 1983 in Cáceres, Extremadura), known as Luismi, is a Spanish former professional footballer who played as a forward or right winger.

References

External links

1983 births
Living people
People from Cáceres, Spain
Sportspeople from the Province of Cáceres
Spanish footballers
Footballers from Extremadura
Association football wingers
Association football forwards
La Liga players
Segunda División players
Segunda División B players
Tercera División players
CP Cacereño players
RCD Espanyol B footballers
RCD Espanyol footballers
Albacete Balompié players
Real Murcia players
UE Lleida players
CD Lugo players
Deportivo Alavés players
Huracán Valencia CF players
Gimnàstic de Tarragona footballers
CD Alcoyano footballers
UE Sant Andreu footballers